The Southside Festival (simply known as Southside) is an annual music festival that takes place near Tuttlingen, Germany, usually every June. The festival as well as its artists and audiences are generally associated within the alternative part of popular music.

The Hurricane Festival, often referred to as the "sister" of Southside, takes place on the same three days in the very north of Germany (contrary to Southside, which is in the very south).

General Information 

The name Southside derives from the English "south side" and refers to Southern Germany where the festival takes place. Festival organizers are FKP Scorpio and KOKO & DTK Entertainment. The festival site consists of 800,000 square meters of former military and airport precincts and features four stages. The festival first took place on the former military airport of Neubiberg (Munich) with approximately 15,000 visitors. In 2002, the number of visitors had risen to 30,000 and kept rising up to 60,000. The revenue for one festival weekend, according to the organizers, amounts to between five and ten million euros. The paramedic service is provided by the Malteser Hilfsdienst, the Johanniter-Unfall-Hilfe (regional association Bodensee-Oberschwaben) and the German Red Cross. Throughout the entire weekend, around 400 helpers do approximately 12,000 hours of work. Crowd surfing is strictly against the festival's safety policy.

History 

The Southside festival first took place in 1999 as a counterpart to Hurricane festival. In 2000, it was moved to Neuhausen ob Eck. Recurring musical acts included:

 Queens of the Stone Age (1999, 2001, 2002, 2005, 2007, 2013)
 Flogging Molly (2005, 2008, 2011, 2014, 2016, 2017)
 The Sounds (2003, 2006, 2007, 2009, 2011, 2014)
 Billy Talent (2004, 2006, 2008, 2010, 2013, 2018)
 Beatsteaks (2002, 2004, 2005, 2008, 2010)
 Black Rebel Motorcycle Club (2002, 2004, 2008, 2015, 2018)
 NOFX (2003, 2008, 2013, 2015, 2018)

2007 (storm incident) 
On the Thursday evening preceding the start of the festival, a storm demolished the tent stage and hurled large and heavy poles through the air. One such pole went through the roof of a paramedic van parked near the stage, killing one occupant and seriously injuring the other. The tent stage acts had to be canceled as a consequence. Festival organizers considered canceling the festival, but decided against it on advice of police, local authorities and even the paramedics team. The two main stages also suffered damage but were sufficiently repaired in time.

2008 
In 2008, the festival took place from 20 June to 22 June. It sold out at around 50,000 tickets and registered a new visitor record. The number of visitors and the hot weather led to a water shortage on Sunday at 11 am.

Musical acts on all three stages consisted of:

 Apoptygma Berzerk, Bat for Lashes, Beatsteaks, Bell X1, Biffy Clyro, Billy Talent, Black Rebel Motorcycle Club, British Sea Power, Calexico, Deichkind, Die Mannequin, Digitalism, Does It Offend You, Yeah?, Donots, Elbow, Enter Shikari, Flogging Molly, Foals, Foo Fighters, Jaguar Love, Jan Delay & Disko No 1, Jason Mraz, Jennifer Rostock, Johnny Foreigner, Kaiser Chiefs, Kettcar, Krieger, Madsen, Maxïmo Park, Millencolin, Monster Magnet, Nada Surf, NOFX, Oceansize, Operator Please, Panic! at the Disco, Panteón Rococó, Patrice, Paul Heaton, Radiohead, Razorlight, Rise Against, Rodrigo y Gabriela, Shantel & Bucovina Club Orkestar, Shy Guy At The Show, Sigur Rós, Slut, Tegan and Sara, The (International) Noise Conspiracy, The Beautiful Girls, The Chemical Brothers, The Cribs, The Enemy, The Flyer, The Kooks, The Notwist, The Pigeon Detectives, The Subways, The Weakerthans, The Wombats, Tocotronic, Turbostaat, Wrongkong, Xavier Rudd.

In addition, the quarterfinals of the UEFA Euro 2008 were broadcast on the big screen.

2009 
In 2009, the Southside Festival took place from 19 June to 21 June. After increasing the capacity to 55,000 visitors, the festival was not sold out with 50,000 visitors. The headliners were Die Ärzte, Kings of Leon and Faith No More.

2010 
The Southside Festival 2010, which took place from 18 June to 20 June, was sold out with 50,000 visitors. According to the organizer, it would have been possible to sell 100,000 tickets – two times more visitors than the terrain could hold.[19] For the first time a fourth stage, called "White Stage", got introduced. This tent complemented the main stage ("Green Stage"), the side stage ("Blue Stage") and the second tent ("Red Stage"). In the late afternoon, Electro music was played in this tent. The motto of the second, new tent was "Electric Circus". Headliner of the 2010 festival were Billy Talent, The Strokes, Massive Attack, Mando Diao, The Prodigy, Deichkind and Beatsteaks. With a big screen, the organizer made a broadcast of the FIFA World Cup possible. Due to continuous rain the entire camping and festival terrain turned into mud. In the night of 17 to 18 June, an event of heavy rain (precipitation: 80 L/m2) required an array of workers, iron sheets, over 500m² of wood chips and several semi-trailers of hay, as well as heavy technical equipment to make both entries to the festival terrain passable again.

In addition, the period reached cold temperatures below 10 degrees Celsius. For this reason, the community opened the Homburghalle, and many residents provided private accommodation and showers. On the day of departure, many vehicles got stuck in the mud and had to be salvaged by farmers with their tractors. Furthermore, the Bundesstraße 311 was so slippery from the mud, which the cars brought from the meadow to the roadway, that it had to be cleaned again and again with special machines. A total of 1800 employees were employed on the grounds during the festival, including 420 paramedics and doctors, around 400 security guards and stewards, as well as stage technicians and other helpers. At the end of the events, 450 mobile toilets had to be emptied and 80,000 rubbish sacks had to be disposed of. The amount of rubbish was immense due to the weather in 2010. Since the festival visitors had left more rubbish behind this year than usual, but it sank into the mud and became solid again, some areas had to be ploughed or dug up, levelled, filled up and reseeded. The festival's visitors had to be able to use the waste for the first time in their lives.

2011 
Neuhausen ob Eck was the venue of the Southside Festival for the twelfth time from 17 to 19 June 2011. Two days before the line-up began, the festival was sold out with more than 50,000 visitors. For the festival 81 artists were engaged: Also in 2011, there were four stages - two open-air stages and two tent stages. On the fourth stage, called the white stage, which was usually reserved for electric acts, there were additional shows consisting out of acrobatics underlined with electronic music. Newly introduced measurements to protect the environment were, "Green Camping",  reduction due to new ways of arriving at the festival and avoidance of creating paper waste. The manager of the estate park outlined at the Southside festival in 2011, that it would be the last one for the time being. Reason for that was the weather. The previous 3 years have been rainy which resulted in the ground being completely sodden, so there was a possibility of the festival not being held for the next 2 to 3 years so the ground could regenerate. The consequences of the mud in 2010, were that the grass only could spear sparsely which is why the soil was then even more in danger. The wood chips which were spread out in front of all the stages also massively acidifies the soil. Als Vorkehrung gegen eine Verschlammung wurden an vielen Stellen Plastikmatten ausgelegt. As a measurement against siltation, some places of the festival area were carpeted with plastic mats.[31] As the festival 2011 was still going on the promoter already announced on 19 June, that even though they have been having mud problems in the years of 2010 and 2011 there is again going to be a festival in Neuhausen ob Eck in 2012, no matter the weather. For this purpose a five-year contract was closed.

2012 
Long before the festival two headliners for the festival in 2012 were confirmed: blinks-182, which were already supposed to perform in 2011 and Die Ärtzte who already ready performed on the southside festival in the years of 2002, 2005 and 2009. Due to the siltation problem, six digit-figure sums of money were invested into the preparation of the ground. A lot of the lawns were supposed to be gravelled.

2013 
The Southside Festival 2013 took place from 21 to 23 June. It was sold out, totalling 60 000 visitors.

2014 
The Southside Festival 2014 started on Friday 20 June and ended on Sunday the 22nd.

2015 
The Southside Festival 2015 took place from 19 to 21 June. Line-Up:

Placebo, Florence + the Machine, Farin Urlaub Racing Team, Paul Kalkbrenner, Deadmau5, Marteria, Alt-J, Jan Delay & Disko No. 1, Cro, Madsen, The Gaslight Anthem, Katzenjammer, Milky Chance, LaBrassBanda, Noel Gallagher's High Flying Birds, Parov Stelar Band, Of Monsters and Men, George Ezra, NOFX, Die Antwoord, Angus & Julia Stone, Death Cab for Cutie, Alligatoah, Frittenbude, Death from Above 1979, 257ers, Black Rebel Motorcycle Club, Irie Révoltés, Suicidal Tendencies, Future Islands, The Notwist, Counting Crows, SDP, The Cat Empire, Backyard Babies, Danko Jones, The Tallest Man on Earth, Kontra K, Olli Schulz, All Time Low, Band of Skulls, The Vaccines, Lagwagon, Millencolin, Jupiter Jones, Chet Faker, First Aid Kit, Sheppard, Kodaline, Casper, Back and Fill, Antiheld, Montreal, AronChupa, Superheld, The Mirror Trap, Oscar and the Wolf, Little May, The Bohicas, Gengahr, Nothing But Thieves, Schmutzki, SomeKindaWonderful, We Are The Ocean, Big Sean, Archive, Burning Down Alaska, uvm.

2016 
The Southside Festival 2016 should have taken place from 24 to 26 June. Due to severe thunderstorms after the first concerts in the early Friday evening, the festival had to be postponed. Later on, it had to be cancelled completely so that none of the headliners were able to play. Only 18 of 88 bands that were booked were able to perform. The concerts of Tom Odell, Elliphant and Flogging Molly had to be ended prematurely. 82 people were slightly injured. 25 of them were brought to the hospital in Tuttlingen while 57 could be treated on-site.

2017 
The festival took place from 23 to 25 June 2017. Because of technical difficulties affecting the Green Stage, the concert of Green Day had to be paused and finally cancelled after two hours.

2018 
The Southside Festival 2018 started on 22 June and ended on the 24th.

2019 
The festival was scheduled to take place from 21 to 23 June 2019.

Past lineups

2000s
2001

Ash
Backyard Babies
Blackmail
Die Happy
Donots
Faithless
Fantomas
Fink
Fun Lovin' Criminals
Fünf Sterne deluxe
Goldfinger
Grand Theft Audio
The Hellacopters
The Hives
Iggy Pop
Incubus
JJ72
Krezip
K's Choice
Last Days of April
Manu Chao
Nashville Pussy
The Offspring
OPM
Paradise Lost
Phoenix
Placebo
Queens of the Stone Age
Slut
Stereo MCs
Suit Yourself
Thomas D
Tool
Die Toten Hosen
The Weakerthans
Weezer
Wheatus

2002 

...And You Will Know Us by the Trail of Dead
A
Die Ärzte
Beatsteaks
Black Rebel Motorcycle Club
The Breeders
Dover
Emil Bulls
The Flaming Sideburns
Garbage
Gluecifer
Heyday
The (International) Noise Conspiracy
Jasmin Tabatabai
Lambretta
Less Than Jake
Lostprophets
Madrugada
Mercury Rev
Nelly Furtado
New Order
No Doubt
The Notwist
The Promise Ring
Queens of the Stone Age
Readymade
Red Hot Chili Peppers
Rival Schools
Simian
Simple Plan
Soulfly
Sportfreunde Stiller
Such A Surge
Suit Yourself
Television
Tocotronic
Union Youth
Zornik

2003

22-20s
Apocalyptica
Asian Dub Foundation
Beth Gibbons and Rustin Man
Blackmail
Brendan Benson
Coldplay
Conic
Console
Counting Crows
Danko Jones
The Datsuns
Fu Manchu
Goldfrapp
Good Charlotte
Grandaddy
Guano Apes
GusGus
The Hellacopters
International Pony
Interpol
Kettcar
Live
Massive Attack
The Mighty Mighty Bosstones
Millencolin
Moloko
Nada Surf
NOFX
Patrice
Pete Yorn
Pinkostar
Radiohead
The Roots
Röyksopp
Seeed
Sigur Rós with Amiina
Skin
Slut
The Sounds
Starsailor
Supergrass
Therapy?
Turbonegro
Underwater Circus
Underworld
Union Youth

2004
 

Air
Amplifier
Anti-Flag
Ash
Backyard Babies
Beatsteaks
Beginner
Billy Talent
Black Rebel Motorcycle Club
The Bones
Breed 77
Bright Eyes
Bungalow Bang Boys
Colour of Fire
The Cure
Cypress Hill
Danko Jones
Die Happy
Dropkick Murphys
Die Fantastischen Vier
Fireball Ministry
Franz Ferdinand
Fünf Sterne deluxe
Gentleman & The Far East Band
Gluecifer
Graham Coxon
grannysmith
The Hives
I Am Kloot
Ill Niño
The (International) Noise Conspiracy
Jupiter Jones
Die Kleinen Götter
Life of Agony
Mando Diao
Mclusky
Mogwai
Monster Magnet
Pixies
PJ Harvey
Placebo
Sarah Bettens
Snow Patrol
Sportfreunde Stiller
Tomte
Wilco
Within Temptation

2005

2raumwohnung
Amplifier
...And You Will Know Us by the Trail of Dead
Athlete
Audioslave
Beatsteaks
Beck
Boysetsfire
Brendan Benson
Broken Social Scene
Die Ärzte
Dinosaur Jr.
Dioramic
The Dresden Dolls
Eagles of Death Metal
Fantômas
Feist
Flogging Molly
Idlewild
Ken
Kettcar
La Vela Puerca
Long Jones
Madrugada
Madsen
Mando Diao
Millencolin
Moneybrother
New Order
Nine Inch Nails
Oasis
Phoenix
Queens of the Stone Age
Rammstein
Sarah Bettens
Ska-P
Slut
System of a Down
Team Sleep
The Eighties Matchbox B-Line Disaster
The Robocop Kraus
The Stands
Turbonegro
Underoath
Wir sind Helden

2006 

Adam Green
The Answer
Apocalyptica
Archive
Arctic Monkeys
Ben Harper & the Innocent Criminals
Ben Jammin
Billy Talent
Blackmail
Coheed and Cambria
The Cooper Temple Clause
Death Cab for Cutie
Nada Surf
dEUS
Delays
Donavon Frankenreiter
Duels
Elbow
Element of Crime
Fettes Brot
Hard-Fi
Karamelo Santo
Klee
Lagwagon
The Lightning Seeds
Live
Mad Caddies
Mando Diao
Manu Chao Radio Bemba Sound System
Maxïmo Park
Photonensurfer
The Raconteurs
Muse
Panteón Rococó
Seeed
Shout Out Louds
Sigur Rós
Skin
The Brian Jonestown Massacre
The Cardigans
The Feeling
The Hives
The Kooks
The Strokes
Tomte
Two Gallants
Wallis Bird
The Weepies
Wir sind Helden
Within Temptation
Wolfmother
Zebrahead

2007 

Arcade Fire
Beastie Boys
Bloc Party
Bright Eyes
Cold War Kids
Deichkind
Die Fantastischen Vier
Dropkick Murphys
Editors
Fotos
Incubus
Interpol
Jet
Juliette and the Licks
Kings of Leon
La Vela Puerca
Less Than Jake
Manic Street Preachers
Marilyn Manson
Me First and the Gimme Gimmes
Pearl Jam
Placebo
Queens of the Stone Age
Snow Patrol
Sonic Youth
The Brayndead Freakshow
Sugarplum Fairy
The Bravery
The Films
The Sounds
Tokyo Police Club

2008

Radiohead
Foo Fighters
British Sea Power
Maxïmo Park
Nada Surf
Tegan and Sara
The Chemical Brothers
The Kooks
The Weakerthans
Turbostaat
Panic! at the Disco
Elbow
Flogging Molly
Calexico
Billy Talent
Panteón Rococó

2009

Die Ärzte
Anti-Flag
Ben Harper
Blood Red Shoes
Brand New
Clueso
Culcha Candela
Dendemann
Disturbed
Duffy
Eagles of Death Metal
Editors
Eskimo Joe
Faith No More
Fettes Brot
Fleet Foxes
Frank Turner
Franz Ferdinand
Friendly Fires
Get Well Soon
Gogol Bordello
Johnossi
Karamelo Santo
Katy Perry
Kings of Leon
Kraftwerk
Less Than Jake
Lykke Li
Moby
Nick Cave and the Bad Seeds
Nine Inch Nails
No Use for a Name
Paolo Nutini
Ska-P
Social Distortion
The Asteroids Galaxy Tour
The Gaslight Anthem
The Living End
The Mars Volta
The Ting Tings
The Whip
The Wombats

2010s 
2010 

Archive
Band of Skulls
Beatsteaks
Biffy Clyro
Bigelf
Billy Talent
Bonaparte
Boys Noize
Charlie Winston
Coheed and Cambria
Cosmo Jarvis
Cymbals Eat Guitars
Danko Jones
Deftones
Deichkind
Dendemann
Does It Offend You, Yeah?
Donots
Dropkick Murphys
Element of Crime
Enter Shikari
Erol Alkan
Faithless
Florence and the Machine
FM Belfast
Frank Turner
Frittenbude
Horse the Band
Hot Water Music
Ignite
Jack Johnson
Jennifer Rostock
K's Choice
Kashmir
Katzenjammer
La Roux
LaBrassBanda
LCD Soundsystem
Madsen
Mando Diao
Marina and the Diamonds
Massive Attack
Moneybrother
Mr. Oizo
Paramore
Phoenix
Porcupine Tree
Revolverheld
Shout Out Louds
Skindred
Skunk Anansie
Stone Temple Pilots
Tegan and Sara
The Bloody Beetroots
The Gaslight Anthem
The Get Up Kids
The Hold Steady
The Prodigy
The Specials
The Strokes
The Temper Trap
The xx
Timid Tiger
Turbostaat
Two Door Cinema Club
Vampire Weekend
We Are Scientists
White Lies
Zebrahead

2011 

Foo Fighters
Incubus
Arcade Fire
The Chemical Brothers
Portishead
Arctic Monkeys
Kaiser Chiefs
My Chemical Romance
Clueso
The Hives
Suede
Kasabian
The Subways
Gogol Bordello
Flogging Molly
Elbow
The Wombats
Jimmy Eat World
Sublime with Rome
Two Door Cinema Club
Boysetsfire
Monster Magnet
The Kills
Lykke Li
Selig
Kashmir
Glasvegas
Band of Horses
The Sounds
Bright Eyes
Sum 41
All Time Low
Klaxons
Eels
Sick of It All
Parkway Drive
William Fitzsimmons
Blood Red Shoes
Jupiter Jones
I Blame Coco
Irie Révoltés
Young Rebel Set
I Am Kloot
Friendly Fires
Darwin Deez
Comeback Kid
Converge
The Asteroids Galaxy Tour
Portugal. The Man
Warpaint
The Vaccines
An Horse
Pulled Apart by Horses
Kvelertak
You Me at Six
Brother
Tame Impala
Cloud Control
Miles Kane
Yoav
Digitalism
Crookers
Trentemøller
A-Trak
Hercules and Love Affair
Frittenbude
Egotronic

2012

Die Ärzte
The Cure
Blink-182
Justice
Rise Against
The Stone Roses
Mumford & Sons
Sportfreunde Stiller
The Kooks
The xx
New Order
Noel Gallagher's High Flying Birds
Wolfmother
LaBrassBanda
Casper
Katzenjammer
Kettcar
The Mars Volta
The Shins
Broilers
Florence and The Machine
Madsen
Garbage
Thees Uhlmann & Band
Eagles Of Death Metal
The Temper Trap
Beirut
Bosse
Bonaparte
Boy
Kraftklub
Ed Sheeran
K.I.Z
City And Colour
Bat For Lashes
Jennifer Rostock
Frank Turner & The Sleeping Souls
Royal Republic
Pennywise
Lagwagon
M83
Hot Water Music
Mad Caddies
La Vela Puerca
Kakkmaddafakka
The Vaccines
Less Than Jake
Zebrahead
My Morning Jacket
All Shall Perish
My Morning Jacket
The Dø
Adept
Selah Sue
The Bronx
La Dispute
Little Dragon
Disco Ensemble
Band Of Skulls
GusGus
Nneka
Bombay Bicycle Club
M.Ward
Die Antwoord
Spector
Black Box Revelation
Young Guns
Other Lives
Twin Shadow
The Computers
Nerina Pallot
Switchfoot
Eastern Conference Champions
Kurt Vile & The Violators
All The Young
Hoffmaestro
Golden Kanine
Turbowolf
We Are Augustines
Willy Moon
Alt-J
Casting Louis
Fritz Kalkbrenner
Steve Aoki
Sebastian
Beardyman
Busy P
Bassnectar
Azari & III
Supershirt
Bratze
Dumme Jungs

2013

Parov Stelar
Gesaffelstein
Archive (band)
Netsky (musician)
Rammstein
Billy Talent
Queens of the Stone Age
NOFX
Passenger (singer)
Frittenbude
Macklemore & Ryan Lewis
Triggerfinger
Kyteman
Arctic Monkeys
Deichkind
Paul Kalkbrenner
Sigur Rós
Bloc Party
Ska-P
The Gaslight Anthem
The Hives
Of Monsters and Men
Belle and Sebastian
Marteria
Left Boy
Prinz Pi
Dallas Green (musician)
Boysetsfire
Danko Jones
Callejon (band)
Friska Viljor
Every Time I Die
The Devil Wears Prada (band)
Turbostaat
The Bouncing Souls
C2C (group)
Two Door Cinema Club

References

External links 

 FKP Scorpio website, the festival's organizer

Rock festivals in Germany
Music festivals established in 1999